Fekejur (also Romanized as Fekejūr; also known as Fīkīchūr) is a village in Owshiyan Rural District, Chaboksar District, Rudsar County, Gilan Province, Iran. At the 2006 census, its population was 451, in 128 families.

References 

Populated places in Rudsar County